Liz Bennett is an American politician, and a member of the Iowa Senate from the 39th District. She initially served in the Iowa House of Representatives for the 65th District after being elected in the 2014 elections.
 She is currently a member of the Democratic Party.

She is the first out LGBT woman to serve in Iowa's state legislature.

Voting Record
In the 2017 legislative session, Bennett voted against a cut of $638,000 to the Department of Veterans Affairs and Iowa Veterans Home.

References

External links

Living people
Democratic Party members of the Iowa House of Representatives
Lesbian politicians
LGBT state legislators in Iowa
Women state legislators in Iowa
People from Cedar Rapids, Iowa
21st-century American politicians
1982 births
21st-century American women politicians